Go Mix! Radio is a network of Christian radio stations in North Carolina, broadcasting Christian music and Christian talk and teaching. Go Mix! Radio is currently heard on 9 full powered stations and one translator in North Carolina.

History
Go Mix! Radio's flagship station, 88.7 FM WAGO in Snow Hill, North Carolina, began broadcasting on July 1, 1998.

In 2021, Pathway Christian Academy purchased AM 1240 WJNC in Jacksonville, North Carolina, along with its FM translator 92.9 FM W225CV, for $150,000, and they became affiliates of Go Mix! Radio.

Stations

References

External links
Go Mix! Radio's official website
Go Mix! Radio's webcast

Christian radio stations in the United States
American radio networks
Radio stations in North Carolina
1998 establishments in North Carolina
Radio stations established in 1998